Phaeocystida, also known as Phaeocystina, is a group of cercozoans in the class Phaeodarea. It was first described by Ernst Haeckel in 1887 and treated traditionally as a suborder, but later was raised to order level until Cavalier-Smith's classification lowered it again to suborder level. It belongs to the order Eodarida, characterised by simpler silica skeletons or a lack thereof.

References 

 Report on the Radiolaria. E Haeckel, 1887
 Report on the scientific results of the voyage of the HMS Challenger during the years 1873–1876. E Haeckel, Zoology series, 1887

External links 
 

 Phaeocystida at the World Register of Marine Spacies (WoRMS)

Phaeodaria
Cercozoa orders